Tallant Tubbs (May 8, 1897 – May 15, 1969) served in the California State Senate for the 19th district from 1925 to 1933 and during World War I he served in the United States Army and United States Marine Corps during World War II. He was the Republican "wet" candidate for the United States Senate in California in 1932, losing to William Gibbs McAdoo, Jr.  Tallant Tubbs was the grandson of Alfred L. Tubbs, a founder of the Tubbs Cordage Co. of San Francisco.

References

External links
Join California Tallant Tubbs

United States Army personnel of World War I
1897 births
1969 deaths
20th-century American politicians
Republican Party California state senators